St. Michael, historically referred to as Saint Michael,  is a city in Nome Census Area, Alaska.  The population was 401 at the 2010 census, up from 368 in 2000.

Geography

Demographics

Saint Michael first appeared on the 1880 U.S. Census as the unincorporated Inuit villages of "Saint Michael and Tachik." Of the 109 residents, 100 were Inuit, 5 were Creole (Mixed Russian and Native) and 4 were White. It returned in 1890 as Saint Michael (though it also included the native village of Tachik and a camp of miners). Of the 101 residents, 38 were natives, 33 were Creole and 30 were White. Saint Michael has continued to report in every successive census to date. It formally incorporated in 1969.

As of the census of 2000, there were 368 people, 90 households, and 65 families residing in the city.  The population density was 16.9 people per square mile (6.5/km2).  There were 93 housing units at an average density of 4.3 per square mile (1.6/km2).  The racial makeup of the city was 6.79% White, 92.66% Native American, and 0.54% from two or more races.  0.27% of the population were Hispanic or Latino of any race.

Of the 90 households, 54.4% had children under the age of 18 living with them, 46.7% were married couples living together, 16.7% had a female householder with no husband present, and 26.7% were non-families. 18.9% of all households were made up of individuals, and 4.4% had someone living alone who was 65 years of age or older.  The average household size was 4.09 and the average family size was 4.79.

In the city, the population was spread out, with 43.8% under the age of 18, 11.1% from 18 to 24, 28.0% from 25 to 44, 14.1% from 45 to 64, and 3.0% who were 65 years of age or older.  The median age was 22 years. For every 100 females, there were 114.0 males.  For every 100 females age 18 and over, there were 120.2 males.

The median income for a household in the city was $33,036, and the median income for a family was $34,000. Males had a median income of $31,250 versus $16,250 for females. The per capita income for the city was $10,692.  About 24.2% of families and 22.9% of the population were below the poverty line, including 23.1% of those under age 18 and 41.7% of those age 65 or over.

Education
St. Michael is served by the Bering Strait School District. Anthony A. Andrews School serves grades Pre-K through 12 grades.

History

Redoubt St. Michael was founded in 1833 by traders of the Russian-American Company, as a trading post for trade with the Yup'ik people of the area. The trading settlement and the island were named after the archangel Michael.

Fort St. Michael, a U.S. military post, was established in 1897. As many as 10,000 persons were said to live in St. Michael during the gold rush. St. Michael was also a popular trading post for Alaska Natives to trade their goods for Western supplies. Centralization of many Yup'iks from the surrounding villages intensified after the measles epidemic of 1900 and the influenza epidemic of 1918.

St. Michael's population today is largely Yup'ik.  Many residents are also descendants of the Russian traders.

Economy
The St. Michael economy is based on subsistence food harvests (hunting, fishing and gardening) supplemented by part-time wage earning.  Most wage-earning positions are in city government, the IRA council and village corporation, schools and local stores.  Some residents hold commercial fishing permits, primarily for the herring fishery.

References

External links

Cities in Alaska
Cities in Nome Census Area, Alaska
Populated coastal places in Alaska on the Pacific Ocean
Populated places established in 1833
1833 establishments in the Russian Empire